David C. Reardon is an American electrical engineer and anti-abortion activist. He is the founder of the Elliot Institute, an anti-abortion advocacy group, and the author of a number of articles and books on abortion and mental health. Reardon was described in the New York Times Magazine as the "Moses" of the "post-abortion movement".

Biography
A graduate of the University of Illinois department of electrical engineering, Reardon began researching the effects of abortion in the mid-1980s. Reardon subsequently received a Ph.D in biomedical ethics from Pacific Western University (Hawaii), an unaccredited correspondence school.

Reardon describes his position on abortion as both "pro-life" (believing a human fetus is deserving of protection) and "pro-woman" and "anti-abortion" (believing abortion hurts women). In a 2002 article in Ethics & Medicine, Reardon argued that in order to be effective, anti-abortion efforts had to present "a moral vision that consistently demonstrates just as much concern for women as for their unborn children." Reardon appealed to the anti-abortion movement to support his "pro-woman/pro-life" strategy writing:

For the purpose of passing restrictive laws to protect women from unwanted and/or dangerous abortions, it does not matter if people have a pro-life view. The ambivalent majority of people who are willing to tolerate abortion in "some cases" are very likely to support informed consent legislation and abortion clinic regulations, for example, because these proposals are consistent with their desire to protect women. In some cases, it is not even necessary to convince people of abortion's dangers. It is sufficient to simply raise enough doubts about abortion that they will refuse to actively oppose the proposed anti-abortion initiative. In other words, if we can convince many of those who do not see abortion to be a "serious moral evil" that they should support anti-abortion policies that protect women and reduce abortion rates, that is a sufficiently good end to justify NRS efforts. Converting these people to a pro-life view, where they respect life rather than simply fear abortion, is a second step. The latter is another good goal, but it is not necessary to the accomplishment of other good goals, such as the passage of laws that protect women from dangerous abortions and thereby dramatically reduce abortion rates.

Reardon's findings conflict with the view of the American Psychological Association, as well as other scientists and researchers, that abortion carries no greater mental-health risk than carrying an unwanted fetus to term.

Media coverage
In a Washington Monthly article titled "Research and Destroy", author Chris Mooney profiled Reardon as an example of what he describes as "Christian conservatives [who] have gone a long way towards creating their own scientific counter-establishment." He also notes that Reardon's findings conflict with those of the American Psychological Association, which in 1990 had rejected "the notion that abortion regularly causes severe or clinical mental problems", and with the conclusions of former United States Surgeon General C. Everett Koop.

In a front-page story for the New York Times Magazine, Slate editor Emily Bazelon described the growth of post-abortion counseling ministries around the United States as part of an effort by the anti-abortion movement to outlaw abortion by stressing its purported psychological effects. She describes Reardon as arguing that the anti-abortion movement will "never win over a majority... by asserting the sanctity of fetal life", and therefore should focus on disseminating information that abortion is psychologically harmful to women as a more effective strategy.

Bazelon goes on to say:
For anti-abortion activists, this strategy offers distinct advantages. It challenges the connection between access to abortion and women's rights — if women are suffering because of their abortions, then how could making the procedure readily available leave women better off? It replaces mute pictures of dead fetuses with the voices of women who narrate their stories in raw detail and who claim they can move legislators to tears. And it trades condemnation for pity and forgiveness. "Pro-lifers who say, 'I don't understand how anyone could have an abortion,' are blind to how hurtful this statement can be," Reardon writes on his Web site. "A more humble pro-life attitude would be to say, 'Who am I to throw stones at others?'

When researchers attack his findings, Reardon writes to the journals' letters pages. "Even if pro-abortionists got five paragraphs explaining that abortion is safe and we got only one line saying it's dangerous, the seed of doubt is planted," he wrote in his book.

Reardon has been described in the Boston Globe as someone who "wants Congress to impose strict barriers to abortion."  The Boston Globe also wrote:
This dual role of advocate/researcher is becoming more common, especially as advocacy groups realize they can sway more opinions by asserting that their research is based on science, rather than simply on personal belief. [David] Reardon, like many people who play this dual role, insists he can objectively look at the data without being influenced by his personal viewpoint.
 

According to the website of the Elliot Institute, which Reardon founded, he is "a frequent guest on Christian radio and Christian television talk shows and has been a frequently invited speaker state and national conventions for crisis pregnancy centers and pro-life organizations." Reardon addressed the National Pro-Life Religious Council in 1998, where he discussed emotional reactions to abortion in the context of the disputed entity of "post-abortion syndrome".

Elliot Institute

Reardon is the founder and director of the Elliot Institute, which in 2005 reported that it had two full-time and one part-time employees. According to its web site, the Elliot Institute studies "the effects of eugenics, abortion, population control, and sexual attitudes and practices on individuals and society at large." The institute was described by USA Today as an "anti-abortion organization focusing on the physical and psychological effects of abortion."

The Elliot Institute has endorsed model legislation regarding informed consent provisions for women considering abortion and bills that would increase the liability of physicians who provide abortions that are deemed "unsafe or unnecessary". The Elliot Institute is also leading an effort to build a coalition of groups to advocate for laws that would create a preemptive ban on human genetic engineering.

Reardon and the Elliot Institute opposed The Missouri Stem Cell Research and Cures Initiative, and proposed a competing initiative which would have prohibited any embryonic stem cell research which resulted in the destruction of a human embryo, as well as some other types of genetic research, in Missouri. The Elliot institute created a website which mimicked the site of a pro-stem-cell-research group, the Missouri Coalition for Lifesaving Cures. The group sued the Elliot Institute in federal court for alleged copyright and trademark violations. Consequently, the Elliot Institute website was ordered temporarily shut down by a federal judge.

Bibliography

See also
Christianity and abortion
Priscilla K. Coleman

References

External links
PubMed list of Reardon-authored studies

American anti-abortion activists
American psychology writers
American male non-fiction writers
American medical researchers
University of Illinois alumni
American health activists
People from Springfield, Illinois
Year of birth missing (living people)
Living people